Poesie pouti is a 1948 Czechoslovak film. The film starred Josef Kemr.

References

1948 films
1940s Czech-language films
Czech short films
Czechoslovak black-and-white films
1940s Czech films